The UniCredit Țiriac Bank headquarters is a class A office building located in the city of Bucharest, Romania. The facility consists of one 64 meter-tall building with 15 floors, with a total surface area of 28,000 m2 (6,000 m2 below ground level and 22,000 m2 above ground).

References 

Skyscraper office buildings in Bucharest
Office buildings completed in 2012